The Fifth Colijn cabinet was the cabinet of the Netherlands from 25 July 1939 until 10 August 1939. The cabinet was formed by the political parties Anti-Revolutionary Party (ARP), Christian Historical Union (CHU) and the Liberal State Party (LSP) following the fall of the Fourth Colijn cabinet on 29 June 1939. The right-wing cabinet was a minority government in the House of Representatives. It was the last of five cabinets of Hendrikus Colijn, the Leader of the Anti-Revolutionary Party as Prime Minister. The cabinet was dismissed by Queen Wilhelmina on 27 July 1939, just two days after it took office.

Cabinet members

 Retained this position from the previous cabinet.

References

External links

Official

  Kabinet-Colijn V Parlement & Politiek

Cabinets of the Netherlands
1939 establishments in the Netherlands
1939 disestablishments in the Netherlands
Cabinets established in 1939
Cabinets disestablished in 1939
Minority governments